Lachnocladium is a genus of clavarioid fungi in the family Lachnocladiaceae.

Species

Lachnocladium archeri
Lachnocladium aurantiacum
Lachnocladium bicolor
Lachnocladium brasiliense
Lachnocladium cervinoalbum
Lachnocladium cristatum
Lachnocladium denudatum
Lachnocladium divaricatum
Lachnocladium dubiosum
Lachnocladium erectum
Lachnocladium flavidum
Lachnocladium fulvum
Lachnocladium hamatum
Lachnocladium hericiiforme
Lachnocladium hoffmannii
Lachnocladium implexum
Lachnocladium madeirense
Lachnocladium manaosense
Lachnocladium molle
Lachnocladium mussooriense
Lachnocladium neglectum
Lachnocladium pallens
Lachnocladium palmatum
Lachnocladium pteruliforme
Lachnocladium ramalinoides
Lachnocladium samoense
Lachnocladium sarasinii
Lachnocladium schweinfurthianum
Lachnocladium setulosum
Lachnocladium simplex
Lachnocladium spongiosum
Lachnocladium strictissimum
Lachnocladium subarticulatum
Lachnocladium subochraceum
Lachnocladium subpteruloides
Lachnocladium ulei
Lachnocladium usambarense
Lachnocladium vimineum
Lachnocladium zandbaiense
Lachnocladium zenkeri
Lachnocladium zonatum

References

Russulales
Russulales genera
Taxa named by Joseph-Henri Léveillé
Taxa described in 1846